Felix Hoffmann (born 18 April 1911 in Aarau; died 16 June 1975) was a Swiss graphic designer, illustrator and stained glass artist. He created countless illustrations for children's books, illustrations from literature (including the only one of Thomas Mann authorized illustration of The Magic Mountain), and stained glass windows, frescoes, and Etchings.

Churches with Hoffmann's stained glass windows 
 Church of Aarau city
 Reformed Church Auenstein
 Reformed Church Bözen
 Reformed Church Kirchberg
 Reformed Church Umiken
 Bern Minster

Illustrations

Fine Press Commissions 
Mann, Thomas, The Magic Mountain (Two Volumes), 1962 for The Limited Editions Club. 
 Stoker, Bram, Dracula, 1965 for The Limited Editions Club. 
Longus, Daphnis and Chloe, 1972 for The Imprint Society.  
Mann, Thomas, Death in Venice, 1972 for The Limited Editions Club.

Children's books 

 "The Story of Christmas: A Picture Book"
Illustrations for Brothers Grimm tales:
  "The Sleeping Beauty"
  "Rapunzel"
 "Four Clever Brothers"
 "Hans in Luck"
 "Tom Thumb"
 "Konig Drosselbart" in English "King Thrushbeard"
 "The Wolf and the Seven Young Kids"
 "The Seven Ravens"

Bibliography 
 Felix Hoffmann, Retrospective, Kunsthaus Aarau, Aargau. Sauerland Verlag Aarau, 1977, .

External links 

 
 Erinnerungen an Felix Hoffmann
 Datenbank Schweizer Kunst, Biografie
 Eintrag zu F.H. bei der Int. Holzschneider Vereinigung Xylon
 Felix Hoffmann - Seine Arbeit im Buch, in Glas und auf der Wand

Swiss graphic designers
Swiss illustrators
Swiss stained glass artists and manufacturers
20th-century illustrators of fairy tales
1911 births
1975 deaths
People from Aarau